The 1978 Auburn Tigers football team achieved an overall 6–4–1 record under third-year head coach Doug Barfield and failed to receive an invitation to a bowl game.  While only slightly better than the previous year's 6–5 record, the 1978 squad fared worse in the Southeastern Conference (SEC) completing the season with a record of 3–2–1.

Four players were named All-SEC players for 1978: defensive back James McKinney, running back Joe Cribbs, offensive tackle Mike Burrow, and defensive tackle Frank Warren.

Schedule

References

Auburn
Auburn Tigers football seasons
Auburn Tigers football